Dan Diner (born 20 May 1946) is an Israeli-German historian and political writer. He is emeritus professor of modern history at the Hebrew University of Jerusalem and former director of the Simon Dubnow Institute for Jewish history and Jewish culture, and professor at the historical seminary of the University of Leipzig. He is also a full member of the philological-historical class of the Saxon Academy of Sciences.

Diner took part at the May 2012 special forum about Timothy D. Snyder's Bloodlands (2010) in the Contemporary European History published by Cambridge University Press, alongside Jörg Baberowski, Thomas Kühne, and Mark Mazower, including Snyder's response.

References

External links 

 Profile at the History Department of the Hebrew University of Jerusalem

1946 births
20th-century German historians
21st-century Israeli historians
Historians of Israel
Living people